This page article documents the acting roles of television and film as well as video game appearances of Mexican singer-actress Paulina Rubio.

Films

Television

References

External links
 

Actress filmographies
Mexican filmographies